Bethamcherla is a town with Nagar panchayat civic status and mandal headquarters located in Nandyal district of the Indian state of Andhra Pradesh. It comes under Dhone assembly constituency and Nandyal Parliament Constituency.

Demographics
 census, the town had a population of 38,994. The total population constitute, 19,424 males and 19,570 females —a sex ratio of 1008 females per 1000 males. 4,882 children are in the age group of 0–6 years. The average literacy rate stands at 65.60% with 22,379 literates, lower than the state average of 67.41%.

Education
The primary and secondary school education is imparted by government, aided and private schools, under the School Education Department of the state.

References 

Cities and towns in Nandyal district